Bwanabwana, also known as Tubetube, is an Austronesian language spoken on the small islands just off the eastern tip of Papua New Guinea. It is spoken in Bwanabwana Rural LLG.

References

Nuclear Papuan Tip languages
Languages of Milne Bay Province